Arcola Elementary School is a historic elementary school building located at Arcola, Loudoun County, Virginia. It was originally built in 1939, as a six-room, one-story, Colonial Revival style school as part of the Public Works Administration building campaign. It has a hipped roof and projecting central pavilion with pediment frontispiece and recessed entrance.  Flanking classroom wings were added in 1939, 1951, and 1956.  It remained in use as a school into the 1970s, when it was re-opened as the Arcola Community Center.

It was listed on the National Register of Historic Places in 2013.

References

Public Works Administration in Virginia
School buildings on the National Register of Historic Places in Virginia
Colonial Revival architecture in Virginia
School buildings completed in 1939
Schools in Loudoun County, Virginia
National Register of Historic Places in Loudoun County, Virginia